This is a list of notable schools in the African country of Rwanda, organized by the provinces of Rwanda.

Kigali City 
 Green Hills Academy
 Ecole Francaise Antoine de Saint Exupery (French School)
 École Belge de Kigali
 International School of Kigali

Northern Province 
 Groupe Scolaire Marie Reine Rwaza

Southern Province 
 Ecole des Sciences Byimana
 Groupe Scolaire Officiel de Butare (GSOB)

See also
 Education in Rwanda
 Lists of schools

References

Schools
Schools
Rwanda
Rwanda
Schools